Darra Khaibar is a Pollywood film of 1971, starring Asif Khan and Surayya Khan.

Cast
Asif Khan
Surayya Khan

References

1971 films
Pakistani black-and-white films
Pakistani drama films
Pashto-language films